Imta or Nibia (fl. late 3rd millennium BCE)  was a Gutian ruler in Sumer. He was the successor of Erridupizir. Imta was then succeeded by Inkishush.

See also

 History of Sumer
 List of Mesopotamian dynasties

References

Sumerian kings
22nd-century BC Sumerian kings
Gutian dynasty of Sumer